Jaman Lal Sharma (1932–2007) was an Indian field hockey player. He won a silver medal at the 1960 Summer Olympics in Rome.

Sharma was born in Bannu, North-West Frontier Province, British India, in what is now Khyber Pakhtunkhwa, Pakistan, in 1932. After retiring as a player, Sharma became a coach and was manager of the Indian hockey team at the Asian Games.

The Government of India awarded him the fourth highest civilian award of Padma Shri in 1990. Sharma died on 26 August 2007, aged 75, following the complications developed after a fall in his bathroom. He had three daughters and a son, Deepak Sharma, who is a Journalist.

In Lucknow, a state hockey tournament is being organized every year since 2008 in his memory.

References

External links

1932 births
2007 deaths
People from Bannu District
Sportspeople from Lucknow
Field hockey players from Uttar Pradesh
Indian field hockey coaches
Olympic field hockey players of India
Field hockey players at the 1960 Summer Olympics
Indian male field hockey players
Olympic silver medalists for India
Olympic medalists in field hockey
Asian Games medalists in field hockey
Field hockey players at the 1962 Asian Games
Medalists at the 1960 Summer Olympics
Recipients of the Padma Shri in sports
Asian Games silver medalists for India
Medalists at the 1962 Asian Games